Opposition may refer to:

Arts and media
 Opposition (Altars EP), 2011 EP by Christian metalcore band Altars
 The Opposition (band), a London post-punk band
 The Opposition with Jordan Klepper, a late-night television series on Comedy Central

Politics
 Loyal opposition
 Parliamentary opposition, a form of political opposition
 Opposition (politics), a party with views opposing those of the current government
 Leader of the Opposition

Opposition parties
 Opposition (Australia)
 Opposition (Queensland), Australia
 Ministerialists and Oppositionists (Western Australia)
 Bahraini opposition
 Official Opposition (Canada)
 Opposition (Croatia)
 Opposition Party (Hungary)
 Official Opposition (India)
 Opposition Front Bench (Ireland)
 Opposition (Malaysia)
 Opposition (Montenegro)
 Official Opposition (New Zealand)
 His Majesty's Most Loyal Opposition (United Kingdom)

United States
 Opposition Party (Northern U.S.) (1854–1858), a Northern anti-slavery party absorbed by the Republican Party
 Opposition Party (Southern U.S.) (1858–1860), a Southern anti-secession party just before the Civil War
 Opposition Party (Illinois) (1874), a coalition opposing Republican Party rule in Chicago and Cook County

Other uses
 Binary opposition, a pair of related terms that are opposite in meaning
 Opposition (boolean algebra), two terms with a shared literal, one positive, the other negative
 Opposition (chess), the position of the kings relative to each other
 Opposition (astronomy), the position of a celestial body
 Opposition (astrology), astrological aspect in horoscopic astrology
 Opposition proceeding, an administrative process available under some patent or trademark laws
 Opposition of the thumb, the location of the thumb opposite to the fingers so that the hand can grasp objects
 Square of opposition, a type of logic diagram

See also

 Apposition (disambiguation)
 Iraqi opposition (disambiguation)
 Opposite (disambiguation)